Guanmenshan (meaning "Closed Gate Mountain") is located in Benxi Manchu Autonomous County, 70 kilometers southeast of downtown Benxi, Liaoning, China.

Its valley, sandwiched between two peaks, one high and one rather low, looks like an area defended by closed gates, so Guanmenshan is called "Closed Gate (Guanmen) Mountain". It is famous for its autumn maple leaves. Guanmenshan is part of Benxi Guanmenshan National Forest Park, a national 4A-level scenic spot.

Gallery

See also
Tourist activities of Benxi
AAAA Tourist Attractions of China

References

External links

Benxi